Ritwik Rasananda Behera (born 10 November 2003) is an American cricketer who plays as an allrounder for the United States national cricket team.

Career
Behera was born and raised in Maryland, United States with an Indian immigrant family from the eastern Indian state of Odisha. Ritwik attended William B. Gibbs, Jr. Elementary School and Roberto Clemente Middle School in Maryland.

Behera started playing cricket at age of 12, under former India U19 player Sunny Sohal in a cricketing facility. He made his Twenty20 International (T20I) debut on 22 December 2021, for the United States against Ireland.

References

2003 births
Living people
Sportspeople from Rockville, Maryland
American cricketers
Odia people
United States Twenty20 International cricketers
American sportspeople of Indian descent